Buch in Tirol is a municipality in the Schwaz district in the Austrian state of Tyrol.

The name of the municipality was changed from Buch bei Jenbach in June 2010.

Geography
Buch lies in the lower Inn valley south of the river.

References

Cities and towns in Schwaz District